Hermit Park is a suburb of Townsville in the City of Townsville, Queensland, Australia. In the  Hermit Park had a population of 3,414 people.

Geography 

Hermit Park is a mixture of predominantly residential premises, commercial and light-industrial businesses, as well as serving as a public services hub.

History
Hermit Park is situated in the traditional Wulgurukaba Aboriginal country.

The origin of the suburb name Hermit Park is from the residence of a business owner Leopold Ferdinand Sachs.

Hermit Park State School opened on 16 June 1924. Hermit Park Infants State School was separated from it on 1 February 1955, but closed on 17 December 1993 and became part of the State School again. This school is still in operation but it is now within the boundaries of the neighbouring suburb of Hyde Park.

St Margaret Mary's Catholic Primary School was established in 1936 by the Sisters of the Good Samaritan. Bishop Terrence McGuire had purchased the Woodlands estate from the Cummins family to use as a convent for the sisters, which was called Saint Philomena's. The need for secondary education for girls in the area led to the sisters establishing St Margaret Mary's College, which was officially opened by Bishop Hugh Ryan on 22 February 1963 with an initial enrolment of 50 girls. St Margaret Mary's Catholic Primary School closed on 11 December 1987, after which it was amalgamated with St John Fisher's Christian Brothers College (Currajong) and the Holy Family Catholic Primary School (Gulliver) to create The Marian School which opened on 21 January 1988 in Currajong. In 1995, St Mary's School (West End) was also amalgamated into The Marian School. St Margaret Mary's College continues to operate but is now within the boundaries of the neighbouring suburb of Hyde Park.

A red light district developed along Herauld Street and the Causeway Hotel before World War II. The Causeway Hotel took its name from the causeway over the nearby embankment and bridge that crossed Ross Creek to provide access to the Townsvillle city centre. However, the massive influx of Australian and American troops into Townsville during World War II caused a dramatic increase in the number of brothels and prostitutes in the area and there were many disturbances in the area, attracting the attention of the local police and military police. The area was also believed to be the cause of considerable venereal disease among the troops which affected military operations, leading to a directive in November 1942 that the Causeway Red Light District was out of bounds for troops. In 1945 some houses burned down in the area and another was washed away in the flood. In 1969 the Townsville City Council resumed all of the properties in the area and demolished them, renaming Herauld Street to be Ford Street and Brodie Street, in order to remove the bad reputation of the area.

Hermit Park Special School opened in January 1979 and closed in 1979.

In the  Hermit Park had a population of 3,414 people.

Facilities 
The Family History Association of North Queensland operates a library at 5 Baker Street; the society supports the research and study of  family and local history and related subjects.

References

External links

 

Suburbs of Townsville